Auto Shankar is a 2005 Indian Kannada-language action comedy film starring Upendra, Shilpa Shetty, and Radhika. The film was directed by D. Rajendra Babu and produced by Ramu, of Ramu Enterprises. The films tells about Shankar an autorickshaw driver belonging to a middle-class family who gets into a conflict with Maya, a money-lender. However, tables turn when she loses her property and they fall in love.

The film was dubbed in Tamil as Aanavakari, in Hindi as Shilpa - The Big Don in 2007, and in Malayalam as Sarappa Sundari. The film was remade in Bangladeshi in 2017 as Ohongkar.

Synopsis 
Shankar is a middle class autorickshaw driver. He is friendly and jovial. Maya, a money-lender, is brought up in a rich family. She is portrayed as a boorish character. She is unscrupulous in recovering loans given to the poor and has designed crude methods to recover the money. She is also the daughter of a lady don.

Shankar defends the poor and fights the moneylenders. Several interesting battles follow, after which the Maya loses all her property and prestige. It is also revealed that she is not really the daughter of the lady don. She then learns a lesson that reforms her attitude. She makes amends and Shankar embraces her as the two fall in love rest forms the plot of the story.

Cast

 Upendra as Auto Shankar
 Shilpa Shetty as Maya
 Radhika
 Sudharani 
 Bhavya 
 Srinivasa Murthy 
 Sumithra 
 Gurukiran
 Avinash
 Srinivas Prabhu
 Ramesh Bhat
 Ashok Rao 
 Lakshman Rao 
Doddanna
Rangayana Raghu 
 Thara Anuradha 
 Ashalatha 
Telangana Shakuntala
 Mohan Raj 
 Rajashekhar Kotian 
 Mohan Juneja 
 Maarimutthu Sarojamma 
 Shanthamma 
 H. M. T. Nandha 
 Padma Vasanthi 
Sadhu Kokila 
B. Jayamma
 Bangalore Nagesh 
 Dileep 
 M. N. Suresh 
 Pailwaan Venu

Production 
As the director was ill during the majority of the shoot, Telugu cinema's renowned associate director Shiva Ramakrishna, an associate of Puri Jagannadh, directed the songs, fight sequences and a major portion of Shilpa Shetty's scenes. The movie was filmed in different locations including Austria, Finland, the Bangalore Palace, and the Mysore Lamps Factory, Mysore.

Controversy 
The film sparked off a controversy with regard to a movie poster depicted a glamour still of Shilpa Shetty from the film. A Madurai based lawyer filed an obscenity case against Shetty. Shetty however, protested by saying that "It (the photo) is not vulgar. I am an actor and an entertainer and I won't endorse vulgarity".

Soundtrack
The music is composed by Gurukiran.

The music of the song "Ready Ready" was used in the Telugu film Nagavalli and the music was given by Guru Kiran.

Reception
A critic wrote that "Auto Shankar is one of those typical mass (or it masala) films which are made in style but lack substance".

Box office
Auto Shankar successfully ran for 100 days. The film was released at the same time as the Puneeth Rajkumar starrer Namma Basava and there was a fierce competition between the two films. Both the films were successful at the box office, but Auto Shankar turned out to be more successful than Namma Basava.

References

External links 

Preview of the film
Review of the film

2000s Kannada-language films
2005 action films
2005 films
Films set in Bangalore
Films scored by Gurukiran
Films shot in Finland
Films shot in Austria
Kannada films remade in other languages
Films directed by D. Rajendra Babu